Michael Rex McMillen (born April 12, 1964, in Las Vegas, Nevada), known as Mike McMillen,  is a short track speed skater from New Zealand who has represented New Zealand at two Olympic Games.

In the 1992 Winter Olympics at Albertville, France, he was on the team which came fourth in the 5000m short-track relay event. The team narrowly missed the bronze medal by just 0.7sec. He also was a finalist in the men's 1000m event, again narrowly missing the bronze medal. He broke the world record for the 1000m during 1992.

In the 1994 Winter Olympics at Lillehammer, Norway he was in the 500m, 1000m and 5000m short-track relay events.

External links
 
 
 
 Mike McMillen at ISU
Mike McMillen at the-sports.org

1964 births
Living people
New Zealand male short track speed skaters
Olympic short track speed skaters of New Zealand
Short track speed skaters at the 1992 Winter Olympics
Short track speed skaters at the 1994 Winter Olympics
American emigrants to New Zealand